Roots to Grow is the second studio album by the Swiss recording artist Stefanie Heinzmann, released by Universal Music Domestic on September 11, 2009 in German-speaking Europe. The follow-up to her platinum-certified 2008 debut album  Masterplan, the singer teamed up again with producers Paul NZA and Marek Pompetzki to work on the bulk of the album, which has songwriting credits by Joss Stone, Rick Nowels, Guy Chambers, Lucie Silvas, SoShy and Bryn Christopher, among others, and collaborations with singers such as Gentleman, Ronan Keating, and group Tower of Power.

Roots to Grow reached number four on the Swiss Albums Chart and made it to the top twenty in Germany, but was less successful than its predecessor, Masterplan. Leading single "No One (Can Ever Change My Mind)" peaked at number twenty-seven on the Swiss Singles Chart but as with the album's other singles, Double A single "Unbreakable"/"Stop" and Gentleman collaboration "Roots to Grow", it failed to reach the top twenty anywhere.

Track listing
All tracks produced by Marek Pompetzki and Paul NZA.

Charts

Weekly charts

Year-end charts

References

2009 albums
Stefanie Heinzmann albums
Polydor Records albums